HD 163145 is a single star in the constellation Scorpius, near the southeast constellation border with Corona Australis. It has an orange hue and is faintly visible to the naked eye with an apparent visual magnitude of 4.85. Based on parallax measurements, it is located at a distance of approximately 307 light years from the Sun. The star is drifting further away with a radial velocity of +35.6 km/s, having come to within  of the Sun some 1.871 million years ago. It has an absolute magnitude of 0.12.

This object is an aging giant star with a stellar classification of K2 III. With the supply of hydrogen exhausted at its core, the star has cooled and expanded off the main sequence. At present it has 20 times the radius of the Sun. The star is radiating 147 times the Sun's luminosity from its swollen photosphere at an effective temperature of 4,450 K.

References

K-type giants
Scorpius (constellation)
Durchmusterung objects
163145
087846
6675